Adrienne Johnson Kiriakis is a fictional character on NBC's daytime drama Days of Our Lives. She had been portrayed by actress Denise Wanner from November to December 1986 before Judi Evans took over the role from December 1986 to February 1991, from May 2007 to January 2008 and from March 2010 to January 2020.

Casting and characterization
The role was initially played by Denise Wanner, as a mysterious character whose face wasn't shown until Judi Evans debuted in the role on December 26 of that year after a widely popular run on the CBS soap opera Guiding Light, where she played Beth Raines from 1983 to 1986. Her run on the NBC soap opera centered on her battles with childhood abuse and her relationship with Justin Kiriakis, played by Wally Kurth. After she left the show in 1991, she joined Another World that year as Paulina Cory Carlino until the show ended in 1999. After a short break from daytime, she returned to DAYS in 2003 as an entirely different character, Bonnie Lockhart and remained in the role until 2007 when she was immediately brought back as Adrienne from 2007 to 2008 and then since 2010. In between her second and third runs on DAYS, Evans joined the cast of the CBS soap opera As the World Turns as Maeve Stone in 2009. The role lasted for several months and followed her almost-relationship with Holden Snyder, played by Jon Hensley. Evans' casting on ATWT coincided with Kurth's return to DAYS, ending plans for a Justin and Adrienne reunion but she eventually returned a year later.

At the time of her 2010 return, Evans spoke to the Sony Pictures Days of our Lives website about her character's onscreen reunion with Justin and their struggling marriage.

"...The way they wrote the characters...they really matured them, they really caught the gist of what their relationship had been as opposed to what it is now. Wally and I kept marveling at how wonderful the writing is. And true to form, true to life, true to the characters."
—Judi Evans, Sony Pictures/Days of our Lives

In February 2015, nearly five years since her return Evans has been upgraded to contract status alongside Wally Kurth and Mary Beth Evans.

In December 2015, Evans and Kurth were downgraded back to recurring status. Evans exited the role on January 24, 2020.

Storylines

1986–1991
Adrienne Johnson, an abused teenager runs away to Salem, where she becomes friends, and moves in with Kayla Brady. At that time Kayla is falling in love with Adrienne's oldest brother Steven Earl "Patch" Johnson. Their abusive father Duke comes to Salem in search of his daughter. He beats and rapes Adrienne when he finds her alone. After the attack she finds a gun, and shoots him. Steve takes the blame and goes on trial for his murder. Adrienne confesses to the crime but after explaining everything does not go to jail. After the murder trial she meets Justin Kiriakis. In 1987 they marry in Greece. Adrienne doesn't like Justin's ties to his uncle Victor Kiriakis' business and makes him choose between her and his work. He ultimately chose her, and they move out. It is however short lived when Victor Kiriakis is shot, Justin returns, without Adrienne. Justin & Adrienne are having trouble conceiving, so when their housekeeper JJ Bagwood gets pregnant she offers them her twins. After a custody battle with the father, Stanley, they receive custody. Later Adrienne becomes pregnant with a baby of her own, Jackson. Before leaving town Justin, Adrienne, and Victor all reconcile. The family is offscreen throughout the nineties. They do not appear for Adrienne's younger brother Jack Deveraux's funeral in 2003 (years later, Jack is discovered alive), however Adrienne makes a call to his wife Jennifer Horton Devereaux offering her condolences.

2007–2020
Adrienne finally returned home in 2007 at her sister-in-law Kayla's request to help Adrienne's amnesiac brother Steve. After accomplishing her goal, she, Justin, and the kids left Salem again for Dubai. In March 2010, Adrienne came back to Salem and she was engulfed in a struggling marriage with Justin, who has feelings for Hope Williams Brady. Hope did not return the feelings and pressured the couple to reunite. Adrienne and Justin divorced but the couple found their way back to one another and remarried. The couple soon welcomed their son Sonny Kiriakis back to town and it is revealed that he is gay. They support him as he comes out to his uncle Victor and as he makes a home for himself with his new life. After remarrying Justin, Adrienne is killed when she is involved in a car accident caused by supervillain Orpheus.

See also 
 Justin Kiriakis and Adrienne Johnson

Notes

References

Further reading

External links 
Adrienne at soapcentral.com

Johnson, Adrienne
Johnson, Adrienne
Johnson, Adrienne
Johnson, Adrienne
Johnson, Adrienne